is a 1987 Japanese anime fantasy martial arts adventure film and the second anime feature film based on the Dragon Ball manga by Akira Toriyama. It was originally released in Japan on July 18 at the "Toei Manga Matsuri" film festival as part of a quadruple feature along with the first Saint Seiya film and the film versions of Hikari Sentai Maskman and Choujinki Metalder. An English dub by Funimation was released in 1998.

Plot
Long ago, in an age where darkness still roams the Earth, a mysterious castle stands among the "five mountains" that are called the 'Devil's Hand' . There, according to the legend, the beautiful "Sleeping Princess" is lying within the confines of the castle walls guarded by the blackest and most sinister master of the underworld.

Years later, eleven-year-old Goku arrives at Kame House to seek training with Master Roshi, and to learn more martial arts skills. He finds Roshi watching the exercise program featuring the girls (which the Turtle Hermit likes) and gets his attention. But while discussing their training plans over lunch, Goku and Roshi noticed a little monk approaching the island on a rowboat. After jumping off his boat and landing on Roshi's island, the monk identify himself as Krillin and also beg Roshi to train him. When Roshi refused, Krillin succeeded to make him change his mind by giving him porno magazines as a bribe. Krillin also meets Goku, who could not tell the difference of how men shaved their heads and made themselves balded. After telling the boys the origin of the Sleeping Princess who is apparently held captive in the Devil's Hand by an evil count named Lucifer, Roshi sends them on a quest far to the west to retrieve her with one rule: whoever brings back the Sleeping Princess will become Master Roshi's student. Meanwhile, a mean blonde-haired girl named Launch also discovered the information of the Sleeping Princess and planned to take her. The boys continued on their way to the Devil's Hand as Krillin uses all the standard tricks to prevent Goku from catching up, but he outsmarts them without giving up. A little later, Bulma, Oolong, Yamcha, and Puar — who are on summer vacation — also meet Roshi and ask where Goku is. Roshi says that he and Krillin have gone far to the Devil's Hand (pretending it as an amusement park or a tourist attraction), so the gang fly in Bulma's Capsule jet to the castle. At sunset, Goku and Krillin finally approached the Devil's Hand itself and went inside. Unknown to the boys, Launch also entered, willing to steal the Sleeping Princess away for herself.

When the gang near the castle as night falls in, the jet is attacked by ogres, causing it to crash down, and Bulma is taken to the Devil's Hand. After waking up in a bedroom, Bulma meets Lucifer himself and his butler Igor who seemingly treat her as a guest and show her to the ogre convention of the Sleeping Princess. Lucifer then revealed his true dark nature to Bulma and have her tied to a chair she sat on with vines, intending Igor to drain her of her blood through a giant syringe in order to awake the Sleeping Princess. Hearing Bulma's screams for help, Yamcha, Oolong and Puar went to the Sleeping Princess' convention, and (in disguise as ogres through Oolong and Puar's shape-shifting) wait for their opportunity to rescue their friend. Goku and Krillin ran into and fight the ogres and monsters, including a giant devil called Ghastel who is then eaten by a swamp monster while attacking them, until they drop in straight onto the bedchamber of the Sleeping Princess which they only find as a giant jewel, disrupting the convention. Then Launch arrives on her motorcycle, takes the Sleeping Princess and drives away. As Goku and Krillin chase Launch without noticing Bulma and the others, Oolong's shape-shifting wears out after five minutes, making Puar change back to herself after she sees in shock that Oolong is back to his normal self. Their disguise ruined, Yamcha, Oolong and Puar are then captured. As Launch blast her way through the ogres by firing her machine gun at them, her hair tickles her nose and she sneezes. Changed into a nice blue-haired version of herself, Launch fell off her motorcycle and landed on the ground, confused of what she is doing. Goku recovered the Sleeping Princess, but Lucifer appeared with the ogres, holding Krillin. After being given a warning which would lead to Krillin's death as a consequence, Goku forcibly returns the Sleeping Princess to Lucifer and demands his friend's release. But instead, Goku gets a beating from the ogres after a pink little devil paralyzed him by biting his tail, the source of his weakness, much to Krillin's despair over him.

Later, Lucifer uses the light of the full moon to power up the Sleeping Princess, successfully awakening her. Outside the Devil's Hand, the gang including a battered and bruised Goku is encased in a giant wall of rock. But Goku looked at the moon and transformed into a Great Ape, smashing the wall and releasing the gang. The rampaging Goku then chases the gang, picking up Launch and attempting to devour her. Yamcha and Krillin grabbed hold of Goku's tail, weakening the Great Ape and allowing Puar to shape-shift into a pair of scissors and cut it off. Goku returns to his normal but naked self, but he did not remember anything of what he had done in his monstrous form. He also panics when he finds his tail gone, but quickly forgets about it. Back inside the castle, Lucifer inserted the Sleeping Princess in a laser cannon and prepared it to destroy the rising sun despite Bulma's pleas. Suddenly, Goku (wearing Oolong's overall pants), Krillin and Yamcha came to the rescue. While the boys fight Lucifer, Yamcha kills Igor and frees Bulma. Just as Lucifer activates the laser cannon, Goku uses the Kamehameha wave to damage it, causing the castle to collapse in the process. While the gang made a run for it, the falling cannon kills Lucifer by blasting him, the Sleeping Princess disappeared and the Devil's Hand is half-destroyed. After the sun is up with no harm, the gang is saved and Krillin acts contrite, although he does not actually apologize to Goku for his behavior. The gang then posed for peace as the unseen camera photographed them and the Devil's Hand. The two boys return to Kame House with Launch, and Roshi is very pleased. Thinking the boys have passed the test on Launch as if she were a Sleeping Princess, he takes them both on as students while he brought Launch with him to his house. At one moment, Goku and Krillin were happy with their time for training, but it then began wrong when Launch changes into her bad self with a sneeze and drives Roshi out of his house. She fires at Roshi, Goku, Krillin and Turtle until a passing fly makes her sneeze again, turning her back to her good self. Launch apologized for her actions as the surprised group then walked back from her a little bit.

New characters

A Demon vampire who lives in Devil's Castle.

A giant red monster who dwells within Devil's Castle.

Cast

Notes

Music
OP (Opening Theme):
"Makafushigi Adventure!"
Lyrics by 
Music by 
Arranged by Kōhei Tanaka
Performed by 
ED (Ending Theme):

Lyrics by 
Music by 
Arranged by Kōhei Tanaka
Performed by

English-language soundtracks
The original version of the Funimation's English adaptation from 1998 replaces the opening theme music with the theme song from the 1995 English dub of the TV series, which they co-produced with BLT Productions. The ending theme was replaced with a condensed, instrumental version of the song, as heard in the end credits of each episode of the 1995 dub. This theme song was written by Peter Berring and Brian Griffith and performed by Dave Steele. The remastered DVDs contained the redone English version of the above songs, performed by Jimi Tunnell and Daphne Gere respectively, recorded for the newer dub of the TV series.

The 1996 Creative Products Corporation English dub (combined with the third film) uses a re-orchestrated English version of the opening theme titled "Get that Dragon Ball", performed by Gino Padilla with Age of Wonder, and featured along with other English-language covers of Dragon Ball songs on the album Dragon Ball • Dragon Ball Z: Songs of a High Spirited Saga - Volume I.

International releases
An obscure English dub was produced and released exclusively in Malaysia by Speedy Video, presumably around the late 1990s, which features an unknown voice cast.

The English rights to Sleeping Princess in Devil's Castle were granted to Harmony Gold originally in conjunction with their rights to the TV series in 1989. They edited the other two films into a special, but never actually did anything with this film other than use bits of footage in their opening theme. Funimation acquired the film in 1995, along with the Dragon Ball series, and the rest of the films.

The English dub of Sleeping Princess in Devil's Castle produced by Funimation was released to VHS in North America on December 15, 1998, a few years after Funimation canceled their original short-lived dub of the series with BLT Productions. The film was dubbed as a video special and was a testing ground to see how a release with an in-house voice production would do (a few of the voices, such as Goku, Bulma, and Launch's, would be replaced in future media). However, while the film was dubbed uncut, the opening and closing sequences were altered/replaced. However, unlike the previous dub of the series and the first film, the original musical score was used except for the aforementioned opening and closing. The VHS was released in two formats: "Edited" and "Unedited". In December 2005, the film was released on a bilingual Region 1 DVD individually and as part of Dragon Ball Movie Box Set with Mystical Adventure and The Path to Power. This set was re-released in a thinpack on February 12, 2008. The film was distributed to VHS and Region 4 DVD in Australia by Madman Entertainment. The film was re-released to remastered 4-disc Movie pack release with the other Dragon Ball films on February 8, 2011, containing Funimation's existing English dub, but restored the opening/ending.

An alternative English dub was produced in France by AB Groupe and released in English speaking markets in Europe. It featured an uncredited voice cast. Both this dub and the Speedy dub are notoriously known for their poor grammar and voice acting, limited pool of voice artists, and unexplained name changes.

A video tape simply labelled Dragon Ball was discovered, containing a fourth (chronologically, first) English dub produced and released in the Philippines by Regal Home Video in the mid-1990s. This dubbed version was edited down and packaged together with the third Dragon Ball film to make one film, much like Harmony Gold did with the first and third films. The cast is believed to be same cast who would later produce an English dub of the first 26 episodes of Dragon Ball Z and later all 153 episodes of the Dragon Ball series that would air in the Philippines (only the first 122 episode were dubbed in English, and the rest were dubbed with the voice actors recording lines with both English and Tagalog (Taglish)).

Dialogue changes
There are several lines that are different in Funimation's English version:
 When Goku and Krillin encounter Ghastel in the Japanese version, they thought he was the Sleeping Princess to which Ghastel revealed he is not. In the English version, the boys demand Ghastel to let the Sleeping Princess go, but he tells them that the Princess is not a human (The Sleeping Princess actually a gem).
 In the English version, Yamcha, Puar and Oolong are already aware of Goku's Great Ape transformation at the full moon and know to attack his tail. It was believed that the film take place after the events of the episodes in the Emperor Pilaf Saga, "A Wish to the Eternal Dragon" and "The Legend of Goku". In the Japanese version, everyone is surprised by the transformation and Krillin figures out the tail is Goku's weakness from when they were previously attacked by Lucifer and his goblin army.
 After Goku turns back to normal from his uncontrollable Great Ape form, he does not remember anything at that time. In the English version of the film, he says to the gang that he understands that there was an ape monster but does not understand why his clothes are gone.
 In the Japanese version, the gang in front of the Devil's Hand was photographed by the camera as they pose for peace. In the English version, the narrator (as an unseen cameraman) called to the gang, "Kids, say cheese.", and they shout back his word before he clicks his camera.
 In the original English version from Funimation, Goku said "What did you say to her?" as he, Krillin, and Master Roshi back away from Launch immediately before the end credits. This line was removed in post-2005 re-releases so that he is silent, more closely matching the Japanese version, as he does not speak during that moment.

Box office

References

External links

1987 films
1987 anime films
Sleeping Princess in Devil's Castle
Films directed by Daisuke Nishio
Films set in castles
Funimation
Japanese animated fantasy films
Japanese fantasy adventure films
The Devil in film
Toei Animation films
Films scored by Shunsuke Kikuchi